The D.C. Everest House is an English-Spanish Baroque-styled home in Wausau, Wisconsin, United States. It was added to the National Register of Historic Places in 1980.

History
David Clark Everest came to Wausau in 1909, when he was made general manager of the new Marathon Paper Mills Company. He led the company for 46 years, into specialty papers and an expansion into printing.

Clark had this house built from 1925 to 1928. It is a three-story U-shaped villa overlooking downtown Wausau. The roofs are hipped and covered with tiles imported from Spain. Parts of the outside are decorated with gargoyles. The inside is decorated with hand-hewn beams, lead-glass windows, and custom decorations.

Everest was inducted into the Paper Industry International Hall of Fame at the Paper Discovery Center in Appleton, Wisconsin in 2000.

See also
D.C. Everest School District

References

Houses in Marathon County, Wisconsin
Houses completed in 1898
Houses on the National Register of Historic Places in Wisconsin
National Register of Historic Places in Marathon County, Wisconsin